Space Ghost Coast to Coast is an American adult animated comedy late-night talk show created by Mike Lazzo for Cartoon Network and hosted by a re-imagined version of the 1960s Hanna-Barbera cartoon character Space Ghost. It is the first TV show to be produced by Williams Street (formerly known as Ghost Planet Industries), the company to start up Adult Swim in the early 2000s. In contrast to the original 1960s series, Space Ghost, which aired as a standard Hanna-Barbera Saturday-morning superhero cartoon, Space Ghost Coast to Coast is a reboot and sequel of the series intended for teens and adults, reinterpreted as a surreal spoof talk show and animated using the original series' artwork. Early seasons are more of a parody of late-night talk shows, while later seasons rely more on surrealism and non-sequitur humor.

Space Ghost Coast to Coast is the first original series fully produced by Cartoon Network. It premiered on April 15, 1994, and originally ended on December 17, 1999. The series was revived on May 7, 2001, and was moved to the then-new Adult Swim late-night programming block on September 2, where new episodes premiered until April 12, 2004. Two final seasons were released exclusively on GameTap from 2006 to 2008. Over 11 seasons, 109 episodes aired. The series helped to launch the careers of animators Adam Reed, Matt Thompson, Andy Merrill, Jim Fortier, Pete Smith, Michael Ouweleen, Erik Richter, Dave Willis, and Matt Maiellaro.

Four spin-off series, Cartoon Planet, The Brak Show, Aqua Teen Hunger Force, and Harvey Birdman, Attorney at Law, are based on Space Ghost: Coast to Coast. The series has also inspired or influenced other animated series for Adult Swim, including Sealab 2021 and The Eric Andre Show.

Premise 

Space Ghost Coast to Coast uses a subverted talk show format hosted by Space Ghost as he interviews live-action guest stars, whom Space Ghost believes to be fellow superheroes, appearing on a monitor beside Space Ghost's desk. In early episodes, Space Ghost begins his interviews by asking guests about their superpowers. His interactions with guests can be awkward because the guests' answers are often changed to humorously match Space Ghost's questions in post-production. Later episodes feature guests being allowed to interact directly with the characters.

Space Ghost's bandleader, an evil, talking mantis named Zorak, and his director-producer, a red-helmeted lava man named Moltar, work forced unpaid labor for Space Ghost, ostensibly as punishment for their crimes committed on the original series. They frequently disrupt the show and make no secret of how much they hate him. Zorak is more openly hostile towards Space Ghost while Moltar is primarily focused on ending each show quickly.

Cartoon Network's Adult Swim often aired two 11-minute episodes back-to-back with advertisements to make a 30-minute programming block. In its first few years, Cartoon Network showed episodes of the original 1960s and 1980s Space Ghost cartoons (sometimes with an added laugh track) after each 11-minute episode of Space Ghost Coast to Coast.

Songs 
Early seasons feature music played by Zorak and his band "The Original Way-Outs". The original theme song, "Hit Single", was composed by free jazz guitarist Sonny Sharrock and performed by Sharrock on guitar, Lance Carter on drums, Eddie Horst on bass, and Alfreda Gerald on vocals. Sharrock and Carter recorded songs for the show that were later compiled on the album Space Ghost Coast to Coast. As a tribute to Sharrock, who died in May 1994 shortly after the show first aired, the episode "Sharrock" featured fifteen minutes of unedited takes of music recorded for the show.

Seasons 4–6 feature a new closing theme by Man or Astro-man?, and in later seasons the opening theme and titles were nearly abandoned. Alternate songs are sometimes used as theme music, including the CHiPs theme song for the episode titled "CHiPs". An hour-long musical season finale featuring the bands Yo La Tengo and Cornershop was planned for the 1998 season but never produced.
©️

Production

Original run
Space Ghost Coast to Coast was created by Mike Lazzo after he was asked to develop a cartoon to appeal to adults. The series' original title stemmed from early 1993 when Andy Merrill and Jay Edwards were brainstorming names for a marathon of the 1960s Space Ghost for Cartoon Network, trying to find things that rhyme with "Ghost". Because of budget limitations, Ned Hastings recycled clips from the original series and reorganized them on an Avid non-linear editor for a "talk show" style program. The characters' crudely animated lips, awkward movements that resembled "paper dolls glued to Popsicle sticks", and continuity errors became part of the joke.

The series premiered on April 15, 1994, having aired initially at 11:00 p.m. ET on Friday nights, with an encore showing of the episode on Saturday night. Later, the program was moved to various late-night time slots, usually on weekends.

January 1995 saw a special episode included on the Turner-distributed VHS release of The Mask after the film, where Space Ghost and Zorak promote the show and interview Jim Carrey and the film's director, Chuck Russell. In February 1995, an episode of Space Ghost Coast to Coast was simulcast on Cartoon Network, TBS, and TNT for the "World Premiere Toon-In" special debut of Cartoon Network's World Premiere Toons series. In the special, Space Ghost interviews a few of the new directors, while the Council of Doom members are the judges of the cartoon clips. The first run ended on December 17, 1999, with the episode "King Dead". But in 2000, Cartoon Network premiered pilots for the show's spin-offs The Brak Show, Harvey Birdman, Attorney at Law, and Aqua Teen Hunger Force, as well as Sealab 2021 — all of which were created by Space Ghost Coast to Coast staff.

2001 revival
In 2001, Cartoon Network announced that Space Ghost Coast to Coast would be revived for another run, but on their late night programming block Adult Swim. The network aired the first two episodes on May 7th and July 22nd of 2001, prior to the launch of Adult Swim. And on September 2, 2001, new episodes and re-runs moved to Cartoon Network's late-night programming block Adult Swim during the block's premiere. The series ended its television run in 2004 with its 93rd episode, "Live at the Fillmore". Space Ghost Coast to Coast would be the only Cartoon Network original series that moved to Adult Swim with new episodes until 2017 when Samurai Jack aired its fifth and final season.

2006 GameTap revival
In 2006, the series returned as a five-minute web series on Turner Broadcasting's GameTap online service, in which Space Ghost interviewed celebrities from the video game industry and GameTap's artist of the month. The series officially concluded with the final webisode on May 31, 2008.

After 2008
On April Fools' Day 2014, Adult Swim broadcast an unannounced Space Ghost Coast to Coast marathon with new material in the form of commercials featuring Space Ghost, Zorak, and Moltar in a voice-recording booth ad-libbing lines from episodes. The series has seen occasional marathons on Adult Swim since, including one on October 22, 2021, in promotion of an Adult Swim tie-in with Carl's Jr.

Characters 

 George Lowe as Space Ghost, Announcer, Salesman, and various other characters
 C. Martin Croker as Zorak, Moltar, and various other characters
 Andy Merrill as Brak, Lokar, and various other characters
 Don Kennedy as Tansit and Announcer
 Judy Tenuta as Black Widow (also guest starred as herself)
 Scott Finnell as Harvey Birdman
 Dave Willis as various characters
 Brad Abelle as Chad Ghostal

Episodes

International broadcast 
In Canada, Space Ghost Coast to Coast previously aired on Teletoon's Teletoon at Night block, and is airing on the Canadian version of Adult Swim.

Home media 
Space Ghost: Coast to Coast has been released on home media in three widespread DVD volumes and two additional volumes only available for purchase through the now-defunct Adult Swim online store. The final six episodes of the television run have never had an official DVD release. Nearly every episode was available to buy through a "build your own DVD" feature on Adult Swim's website. Thus the final season episodes, early episodes that were left off the first volume, and unedited shows that had been altered on the official releases were now available to own, but only in DVD-ROM form.

In 2006, episodes were made available on the Xbox Live Marketplace. The series, along with other Adult Swim shows such as Robot Chicken, Aqua Teen Hunger Force, Samurai Jack, and Rick and Morty was released on HBO Max on its May 2020 launch.

Legacy 

Alex Toth, the creator of Hanna-Barbera's Space Ghost, was rumored to have been displeased with the usage of his characters in parody, but Toth disproved the rumor through written letters by admitting he appreciated all adaptations of his work.

Cartoon Planet, a spin-off featuring Space Ghost, Zorak, and Brak hosting a variety show on the Cartoon Planet, premiered on Cartoon Network and its sister network TBS in 1995.

From 1997 to 2003, Space Ghost Coast to Coast comics was published in anthology comics Cartoon Network Present, Cartoon Network Starring and Cartoon Cartoons by DC Comics.

In 2000, the show either spun off or directly inspired the four original cartoons that constituted Adult Swim's comedy block—Sealab 2021; The Brak Show; Harvey Birdman, Attorney at Law; and Aqua Teen Hunger Force. Although Harvey Birdman used traditional animation to flash animation, the rest used the same limited animation style as Space Ghost Coast to Coast, and all four shows were created by the original writers and staff for the series. The Brak Show included the characters Brak and Zorak, recurring characters on Space Ghost Coast to Coast.

Various Space Ghost Coast to Coast clips and shorts have been made after the series.
 December 13, 2009: interview with Zoe Saldana to promote James Cameron's Avatar.
 2010: interview with Jack Black to promote Gulliver's Travels.
 A short interviewing NBA star Steve Nash and promoting Vitamin Water was made available online.
 2011: on April Fools' Day, Adult Swim aired The Room again. Space Ghost interviewed Tommy Wiseau during commercial breaks.
 2012: interview with Will Ferrell and Zach Galifianakis to promote The Campaign.

In a 2012 interview, Eric André mentioned being a big fan of the show, stating it was a major influence on him while developing his own series for Adult Swim, The Eric Andre Show. Before shooting Andre would rewatch several episodes of Space Ghost Coast to Coast in a row in order to "absorb as much Space Ghost" as he could. Andre would also ask executive producer and Adult Swim president Mike Lazzo several questions about the series, as he was an executive during its production run. To Andre's surprise Lazzo had no interest in Space Ghost Coast to Coast, saying "Space Ghost is dead to me".

Space Ghost is mentioned in the opening lyrics of cello rock band Rasputina's song "The Olde Headboard", which is featured on their 1998 album How We Quit the Forest.

Space Ghost Coast to Coast is featured in the Danger Doom song "Space Ho's".

Four rocks found on the planet Mars were named after Space Ghost, Zorak, Moltar, and Brak. 

In January 2009, IGN named Space Ghost Coast to Coast as their 37th favorite animated TV show in their Top 100 Best Animated TV Shows article.

In 2013, IGN placed Space Ghost Coast to Coast as number 18 on their list of Top 25 animated series for adults.

Rapper SpaceGhostPurrp named himself after the titular character and used the character's image for the cover of his NASA mixtape.

Space Ghost appears on the 1998 series Donny & Marie to promote the CD Space Ghost's Surf & Turf.

Space Ghost can be seen in the beginning of The Powerpuff Girls Movie in the movie theatre next to other Warner Bros., Hanna-Barbera, and Cartoon Network characters, such as Zorak and Brak. He was also in a promo advertising the movie.

Space Ghost appears on the 2002 The Brak Show episode "Runaway" and the 2003 episode "Enter the Hump".

In the cold opening for the 2003 Aqua Teen Hunger Force episode "The Dressing", Space Ghost's body is seen on the floor dripping with blood, and Dr. Weird is seen putting Space Ghost's head over his own. Seth Green appears in footage of an unaired Space Ghost Coast to Coast episode entitled "One Way Out".

Space Ghost appears in a 2004 promo for the animated series Tom Goes to the Mayor, where he interviews Tom and the Mayor.

Space Ghost appears in the 2004 Adult Swim special Anime Talk Show.

Space Ghost makes a cameo in the 2006 Robot Chicken episode "Suck It".

Space Ghost makes a cameo in the 2007 film Aqua Teen Hunger Force Colon Movie Film for Theaters. Space Ghost has been in commercials for Coca-Cola, Dr Pepper, AT&T, Nestea, Esurance, and Vitamin Water and has appeared in bumps and promos for Cartoon Network and Adult Swim.

In 2007, Cartoon Network Spain produced an adaptation of the series which aired as part of the Adult Swim block on TNT Spain. It replaced the guests with Spanish celebrities.

Space Ghost, Moltar, Zorak, Brak, and Mojo Jojo from The Powerpuff Girls appear in a 2002 interview with professional soccer player Hugo Sánchez on the Latin America Cartoon Network channel, and again in 2003 interviewing Óscar Pérez Rojas (which also features Eustace from Courage the Cowardly Dog).

Space Ghost appears in the 2011 Adult Swim pilot Earth Ghost, a reworking of a 2007 live-action pilot Lowe Country.

Space Ghost appears in the 2011 Batman: The Brave and the Bold episode "Bold Beginnings".

Issue 40 of the comic book Scooby-Doo Team-Up features a non-satirical Space Ghost in his traditional role as a space-traveling superhero, albeit one who captures Moltar and Zorak with the help of Scooby-Doo. Sidekicks Jan and Jace say that the two villains are clever and that once, to keep him from interfering in their plans, they even "hypnotized him into thinking he was a talk show host! Fortunately, he snapped out of it after eight seasons." On hearing that, Space Ghost frowns and says, "I don't want to talk about it."

In the late 1990s, CartoonNetwork.com hosted a Flash game called "How Zorak Stole X-mas". In the game, the player controls Space Ghost, who zaps Zorak with his power bands, dodges Zorak's thrown eggs, and prevents Zorak from escaping with Christmas presents. Another game, "Blast Zorak", had the player use Space Ghost to blast Zorak as much as possible before the time runs out.

British indie band Glass Animals references Space Ghost Coast to Coast on their 2020 album Dreamland with a song of the same name.

In that same year, a puppet version of Brak appeared in YouTube videos uploaded by Andy Merrill.

See also 

 List of Space Ghost Coast to Coast characters
 List of Space Ghost Coast to Coast episodes
 Take Two with Phineas and Ferb, animated series with a similar premise
 Tooning Out the News, animated news program with a similar premise
 Earth to Ned, a puppet talk show with a similar premise
 Miss Tilly's Fun Time TV Minute, animated shorts with a similar premise

Notes

References

External links 

 
 Space Ghost Coast to Coast at Cartoon Network 
 
 
 Space Ghost Reunion Panel (Audio) on December 5, 2011, by Cinefamily

 
1994 American television series debuts
1999 American television series endings
2001 American television series debuts
2004 American television series endings
2006 web series debuts
2008 web series endings
1990s American late-night television series
1990s American surreal comedy television series
1990s American television talk shows
1990s American adult animated television series
2000s American adult animated television series
2000s American late-night television series
2000s American surreal comedy television series
2000s American television talk shows
American adult animated comedy television series
American sequel television series
Animated television series reboots
English-language television shows
Adult Swim original programming
TBS (American TV channel) original programming
TNT (American TV network) original programming
American adult animated web series
American television series with live action and animation
Television series created by Mike Lazzo
Coast to Coast
Web talk shows
Television series by Hanna-Barbera
Television series by Williams Street
Television series about television
Fictional television shows
American comedy web series
American television series revived after cancellation
Teen animated television series